Luis Alfredo Yanes Padilla (born 29 October 1982) is a retired Colombian football forward.

Career
Yanes was drafted by NorthEast United FC for the 2014 Indian Super League season in the Inaugural International Draft.

Coaching career
In September 2019, Yanes was appointed assistant manager of Sergio Novoa at Atlético Bucaramanga.

Career statistics

International

Statistics accurate as of match played 16 August 2006

References

External links
 

1982 births
Living people
People from Santa Marta
Association football forwards
Colombian footballers
Colombia international footballers
Boyacá Chicó F.C. footballers
Independiente Santa Fe footballers
Lille OSC players
Atlético Junior footballers
Cúcuta Deportivo footballers
La Equidad footballers
Zamora FC players
Atlético Bucaramanga footballers
NorthEast United FC players
Categoría Primera A players
Ligue 1 players
Indian Super League players
Colombian expatriate footballers
Expatriate footballers in France
Expatriate footballers in Venezuela
Expatriate footballers in India
Colombian expatriate sportspeople in France
Colombian expatriate sportspeople in Venezuela
Colombian expatriate sportspeople in India
Sportspeople from Magdalena Department